Ping and Friends is an animated musical children's television series created by Celia Catunda and Kiko Mistrorigo. Produced by TV PinGuim and Kondolole Films, the series premiered on November 12, 2018 on TVOKids in Canada, and on November 19 on Discovery Kids in Brazil.

Plot 
Ping and Friends follows two best friends; Ping, a bird, and Pong, a dog, a duo who love music. With their friends Mr. Prickles, Matilda and Trix06, they always find a reason to create a new song in Melody Meadows. For Ping and Pong, the answer to everything is music.

Characters 
 Ping, a small yellow canary
 Pong, an insightful orange beagle
 Matilda, an Egyptian mau who loves dancing.
 Mr. Prickles, a neurotic hedgehog
 Trix06, Ping and Pong's robot assistant

Episodes

Broadcast 
Ping and Friends had its world debut in Canada on November 12, 2018 on TVOKids. The series then premiered on Knowledge Kids on January 16, 2019. In Quebec, the series premiered on Télé-Québec on February 25, and on May 27, 2019 on TFO. In Brazil, the series premiered on Discovery Kids on November 19, 2018. In the rest of Latin America, the series premiered on the same channel on February 26, 2019.

In the United States, 13 episodes of the series are available on Amazon Prime and airing on Vme Kids.

Media information 
An app based on the series, "Music with Ping and Friends" was released on the iTunes store, as well as Google Play. The game offers three educational musical activities.

References

External links 
 

2010s Brazilian animated television series
2010s Canadian animated television series
2018 Brazilian television series debuts
2018 Canadian television series debuts
Brazilian children's animated television series
Canadian children's animated musical television series
Canadian preschool education television series
English-language television shows
Animated television series about birds
Animated television series about dogs
Animated preschool education television series
2010s preschool education television series